The 2015–16 Tahiti Ligue 1 is the 69th season of top-flight football in Tahiti. Tefana are the defending champions having won their fourth title last season.

Teams

A total of eight sides will compete in the 2015–16 campaign. The top side will qualify for a place in the 2017 OFC Champions League, while the bottom two will be relegated to Tahiti Ligue 2.

League table

Championship playoff

Bracket

Semi-finals

Final

References

Tahiti Ligue 1 seasons
Tahiti
Tahiti
Ligue 1
Ligue 1